Universidad Arturo Prat is a university in Chile. It is a derivative university part of the Chilean Traditional Universities.

The university was created in 1981 from the former campus of the University of Chile in Iquique.  It also has campuses in Arica, Calama, Santiago and Victoria

External links

 Official Web Site 
 Universidad Arturo Prat Indicators, Research and Statistics

Universities in Chile
Universities in Los Ríos Region
Educational institutions established in 1984
1984 establishments in Chile